Stradbroke is an English village in the Mid Suffolk district of the county of Suffolk. The Census of 2011 gave the parish a population of 1,408, with an estimate of 1,513 in 2018.

Heritage

The village was listed in the Domesday Book of 1096 as being in the Bishop's Hundred, later renamed Hoxne Hundred. The village name was sometimes spelt Stradbrook in the Middle Ages and in local documents as late as the early 19th century.

A post-medieval source states that the prominent medieval philosopher Robert Grosseteste, also Bishop of Lincoln, was born in Stradbroke in about 1175, but there is no medieval evidence to confirm this. Its parish church of All Saints, with a 15th-century tower and a raised stair turret, dominates the village as a landmark.

In October 2014 the state primary school marked the 150th anniversary of its predecessor's opening on 28 September 1864.

The village used to host a Navy Day on the last Saturday in July, to mourn the end of the Royal Navy's rum ration in July 1970. as part of the celebration a tot of rum was processed round the village. The last such event was held in 2007.

Amenities
Stradbroke's position as a centre for smaller villages and hamlets means it has more facilities than its population might suggest. It serves as an education centre for Mid Suffolk, with a primary school and a high school in the village.

There are two pubs, several shops, and local services that include a public library, a community centre, a swimming pool and a gym. It has a playing field for cricket and football, three tennis courts, two bowling greens and a fitness track. Near the community centre there is a doctor's surgery and a play area for young children. At Westhall there is another play area and a recreation ground for informal games.

The village post office reopened in 2014 in the local library, housed in the historic courthouse building. The previous post office in a shop had closed. Library staff work on both the post office and library counters. The village shop was refurbished in 2014. There is also a bakery, a butcher's shop, a wedding shop, and an antiques centre and cafe.

A pond was donated at the top of the site, overlooked by donated public seats. There are views of the church towards the centre of the village.

Stradbroke has a free magazine, the Stradbroke Monthly, and an online community radio station, Radio Stradbroke. The Stradisphere Festival was an annual music event held between 2013 and 2018 in the village featuring acts including Badly Drawn Boy.

Transport
Stradbroke lies midway between Norwich and Ipswich on the B1117 and B1118 secondary roads, some 7 miles (11 km) from the Suffolk town of Eye and 9 miles (14.5 km) from the Norfolk market town of Diss, where the village's nearest railway station is located. Train services from Diss take an hour and a half to reach London. There is a limited public school bus service linking Stradbroke to Eye, Framlingham and Ipswich.

Notable people
In birth order: 
Robert Grosseteste (c. 1175–1253), scholar and Bishop of Lincoln, was born in Stradbroke.
Mary Matilda Betham (1776–1852), diarist, poet and miniature painter, was born in Stradbroke.
William Betham (1779–1853), antiquarian, brother of Mary Matilda, was born in Stradbroke.
J. C. Ryle (1816–1900), became Vicar of Stradbroke in 1861 and set in motion a restoration of the church in the 1870s. He later became Bishop of Liverpool.
Herbert Edward Ryle (1856–1925), son of J. C. Ryle, was brought up in Stradbroke. He later served successively as Bishop of Exeter, Bishop of Winchester and Dean of Westminster.

Notes

References
S. Govier, 2010, An Illustrated History of Stradbroke and Denham

External links

 
Villages in Suffolk
Civil parishes in Suffolk
Mid Suffolk District